Alice Auersperg is an Austrian cognitive biologist specializing in the evolution of intelligence in birds. Her research is primarily focused on the physical cognition, play behavior, problem-solving and tool-making abilities in parrots and corvids. Since 2011, she has managed the Goffin Lab of Comparitive Cognition at the Messerli Research Institute of the University of Veterinary Medicine Vienna in Austria, where she has extensively studied the intelligence of the Tanimbar corella, also known as the Goffin's cockatoo.

Auersperg graduated from the University of Vienna in 2011. She wrote her thesis on the spatial awareness of kea (Nestor notabilis). She has also published research on the abilities of corvids, parrots, and orangutans to create tools in order to solve problems and complete tasks.

In 2021, she was awarded both the Science Prize of the State of Lower Austria and the Kardinal Innitzer Promotion Prize.

See also 

 Behavioral ecology
 Irene Pepperberg
 Tool use by animals
 Ornithology

References

External links 
 Dr. Alice Auersperg's Goffin Lab at the Messerli Research Institute

Austrian biologists
Austrian ornithologists
Evolutionary biologists
University of Vienna alumni
21st-century biologists
Year of birth missing (living people)
Living people